Thénouville is a commune in the department of Eure, northern France. The municipality was established on 1 January 2017 by merger of the former communes of Bosc-Renoult-en-Roumois (the seat) and Theillement. On 1 January 2018, the former commune of Touville was merged into Thénouville.

See also 
Communes of the Eure department

References 

Communes of Eure
Populated places established in 2017
2017 establishments in France